Bulgarism is an ideology aimed at the "revival of Bulgars' national identity" and Volga Bulgaria statehood. It originated in the second half of 19th century within the Wäisi movement and the Society for the study of the native land (Chuvashia) It was revived at the end of the 20th century as "neobulgarism" in Tatarstan and Chuvashia.

The ideology is based on the theory that Volga Tatars and Chuvashs descend from Volga Bulgars.  The theory was supported by the Soviet authorities in mid-20th century as an alternative to the "reactionary" theory claiming the Golden Horde descent.

At the turn of 20th and 21st centuries, the ideas of bulgarism had been revived through the activities of neobulgarists.

See also 
Cäğfär Taríxı

References

Bulgars
Chuvash people
Tatar topics
National revivals